"Erlkönig", Op. 1,  328, is a Lied composed by Franz Schubert in 1815, which sets Johann Wolfgang von Goethe's poem of the same name. The singer takes the role of four characters — the narrator, a father, his small son, and the titular "Erlking", a supernatural creature who pursues the boy — each of whom exhibit different tessitura, harmonic and rhythmic characteristics. A technically challenging piece for both performers and accompanists, "Erlkönig" has been popular and acclaimed since its premiere in 1821, and has been described as one of the "commanding compositions of the century".

Among Schubert's most famous works, the work has been arranged by various composers, such as Franz Liszt (solo piano) and Heinrich Wilhelm Ernst (solo violin); Hector Berlioz, Franz Liszt, and Max Reger have orchestrated the piece.

History 

Goethe's poem was set in music by at least hundred composers, including Johann Friedrich Reichardt, Carl Friedrich Zelter and Carl Loewe, though no work would become as preeminent as Schubert's, which stands among the most performed, reworked and recorded compositions ever written.

Schubert composed "Erlkönig" at the age of 18 in 1815 – Joseph von Spaun claims that it was written in a few hours one afternoon. He revised the song three times before publishing his fourth version in 1821 as his Opus 1. The work was first performed in concert on 1 December 1820 at a private gathering in Vienna. The public premiere on 7 March 1821 at the Theater am Kärntnertor was a great success, and quickly propelled the young composer to fame in Vienna.

Publication history 

"Erlkönig" exists in four versions by Schubert's hand, with the 3rd version featuring a simplified piano accompaniment without triplets in the right hand. The original (for medium voice) is in the key of G minor, though there are also transposed editions for high and low voice.

Structure and musical analysis 

Schubert's adaptation of "Erlkönig" is a romantic musical realization that represents the various rational and irrational elements of Goethe's ballad by contrasting yet unifying musical elements. Its form is the through-composed song; although the melodic motives recur, the harmonic structure is constantly changing and the piece modulates within the four characters.

Characters 
The four characters in the song – narrator, father, son, and the Erlking – are all sung by a single vocalist. The narrator lies in the middle range and begins in the minor mode. The father lies in the lower range and sings in both minor and major mode. The son lies in a higher range, also in the minor mode. The Erlking's vocal line, in the major mode, provides the only break from the ostinato bass triplets in the accompaniment until the boy's death. Schubert places each character largely in a different tessitura, and each has his own rhythmic and harmonic nuances; in addition, most singers endeavor to use a different vocal coloration for each part.

A fifth character, the horse on which the father and boy are riding, is implied in rapid triplet figures played by the pianist throughout the work, mimicking hoof beats.

Structure 
"Erlkönig" begins with the piano playing rapid triplets to create a sense of urgency and simulate the horse's galloping. The moto perpetuo triplets continue throughout the entire song except for the final three bars and mostly comprise the uninterrupted repeated chords or octaves in the right hand that were established at the opening.

In the introduction, the left hand of the piano part introduces an ominous bass motif composed of rising scale in triplets and a falling arpeggio, pointing to the background of the scene and suggesting the urgency of the father's mission. It also introduces a chromatic "passing note motif" consisting of C–C-D that represents a daemonic force, and used throughout the work.

Verse 1 

After a long introduction of fifteen measures, the narrator raises the question "Wer reitet so spät durch Nacht und Wind?" and accentuates the key words "Vater" (father) and "seinem Kind" (his child) in the reply. A link between "Wind" and "Kind" is suggested in the placement in a major tonality. The verse ends where it started, in G minor, seemingly indicating the narrator's neutral point of view.

Verse 2 

The father's question to his son is harmonically supported by a modulation from the tonic to the subdominant, also employing the "passing note motif" from the introduction. The son's distress is represented by the high pitch of this reply and the repetitive nature of the phrase. As the child mentions the Erlking, the harmony passes into F major, representing a gravitation from the father's tonality to the Erlking. The father calms the son, which is expressed by the low register of the singing voice.

Verse 3 

After a short piano interlude, the Erlking starts to address the boy in a charming, flattering melody in B major, placing emphasis on the words "liebes" (dear) and "geh" (go). The descending intervals of the melody seems to provide a soothing response to the boy's fear. Though the Erlking's seductive verses differ in their accompanying figurations (providing some relief for the pianist), they are still based on triplets, not letting the daemonic presence be forgotten. The "passing note motif" is used twice.

Verse 4 

The son's fear and anxiety in response to the Erlking's words is highlighted by the immediate resumption of the original triplet motif, just after the Erlking finishes his verse. The chromaticism in the son's melody indicates a call to his father, creating dissonances between the vocal part and the bass that evoke the boy's horror. The harmonic instability in this verse allude to the child's feverish wandering. The father's tonal center becomes increasingly distant from the child's, suggesting a rivalry over possession of the boy with the Erlking.

Verse 5 

The Erlkönig's enticement intensifies. The piano accompaniment transforms into flowing major arpeggios that may refer to the dances of the Erlking's daughters and the troubled half-sleep of the child. The presence of the daemonic is once again highlighted by the "passing note motif". As in the Erlking's first verse, the octave triplets resume immediately after the verse.

Verse 6 

The son cries out to his father, his fear again illustrated in rising pitch and chromaticism.

Verse 7 

Before the Erlking speaks again, the ominous bass motif foreshadows the outcome of the song. The Erlkönig's luring now becomes more insistent. He threatens the boy, the initial lyricism and playfulness yielding to a measured declamation, with the "passing note motif" being voiced both in the treble and in the bass. Upon the word "Gewalt" (force), the tonality has modulated from E major to D minor, with the Erlking appropriating the minor tonality originally associated with the father and his child. The "passing note motif" on the word "Erlkönig" suggest that the fate of the child is sealed.

Verse 8 

The music intensifies further, Schubert once again creating tension through the "galloping motif". The grace notes in the voice line suggest the father's horror, and the music accelerates on the words "er reitet geschwind" (he swiftly rides on). A final allusion to the father's tonality of C minor is followed by the Neapolitan chord of A major, as the father spurs his horse to go faster and then arrives at his destination. Before this chord is resolved, the triplet motif stops, and the final rendition of the "passing note motif" in the bass seems to seal the fate of the boy.

The recitative, in absence of the piano, draws attention to the dramatic text and amplifies the immense loss and sorrow caused by the Son's death.

The resolution of C to D major implies a "submission to the daemonic forces", followed by the final cadence delivering "a perfect consummation to the song".

Tonality 
The song has a tonal scheme based on rising semitones which portrays the increasingly desperate situation:

The "Mein Vater, mein Vater" music appears three times on a prolonged dominant seventh chord that slips chromatically into the next key. Following the tonal scheme, each cry is a semitone higher than the last, and, as in Goethe's poem, the time between the second two cries is less than the first two, increasing the urgency like a large-scale stretto. Much of the major-key music is coloured by the flattened submediant, giving it a darker, unsettled sound.

Reception and legacy 
The premiere in 1821 was an immediate success; the large audience broke out in "rapturous applause", as Joseph von Spaun reported. During the 1820s and 30s, "Erlkönig" was unanimously acclaimed among the Schubert circle, critics and general audiences, with critics hailing the work as "a masterpiece of musical painting", "a composition full of fantasy and feeling, which had to be repeated", "an ingenious piece" that leaves an "indelible impression". No other performance of Schubert's work during his lifetime would receive more attention than "Erlkönig".

Joseph von Spaun sent the composition to Goethe, hoping to receive his approval for a print. The latter, however, sent it back without comment, as he categorically rejected Schubert's form of the through-composed song. However, when Wilhelmine Schröder-Devrient performed "Erlkönig" before Goethe in 1830, he is reported by Eduard Genast to have said: "I have heard this composition once before, when it did not appeal to me at all; but sung in this way the whole shapes itself into a visible picture".

"Erlkönig" has had enjoyed enduring popularity since its inception to this day. Dietrich Fischer-Dieskau has highlighted the piano accompaniment in the setting, which he describes as having a "compositional life of its own", with important motifs such as the repeated octaves that create an eerie, suspenseful atmosphere. Furthermore, Fischer-Dieskau praised the "magnificent tragedy" of the setting.

Graham Johnson writes that "Erlkönig is one of those songs that defies age (the composer's, particularly) and defines an age. Like Beethoven's Fifth Symphony it appeals to the great unwashed and the squeaky-clean in equal measure, to those who see something symbolic in the poem, and to those who simply love a rattling good yarn excitingly told. It was that rare thing: a hit that absolutely deserved to be."

The piece is regarded as challenging to perform due to the multiple characters the vocalist is required to portray, as well as its difficult accompaniment, involving rapidly repeated chords and octaves.

Arrangements 
"Erlkönig" has been arranged for various settings: for solo piano by Franz Liszt (1838, revised 1876; S. 558/4), for solo violin by Heinrich Wilhelm Ernst (1854; Grand Caprice für Violine allein, Op. 26), and for solo voice and orchestra by Hector Berlioz (1860; H. 136, NBE 22b), Franz Liszt (1860; S. 375/4) and Max Reger (1914).

Brian Newbould wrote on the arrangements: "Most, like Liszt's transcriptions of the Lieder or Berlioz's orchestration for Erlkönig, tell us more about the arranger than about the original composer, but they can be diverting so long as they are in no way a replacement for the original."

For solo piano (Liszt) 

Franz Liszt arranged "Erlkönig" for solo piano as part of his Twelve Songs by Franz Schubert, S. 558, which was published in 1838 and revised in 1876. Compared to the original, Liszt retains many of the basic musical elements, including melody, harmony, accompanimental patterns, and dynamics. The melody is transcribed to different registers of the piano: the narrator and the son remain in the same register as the voice, the father moves an octave lower, and the Erlking moves an octave higher. Liszt, being a virtuoso pianist, adds even more technical challenges for the pianist, for instance turning the bass motif in the left hand into octaves:

A critic for the Courrier de Lyon remarked on these octaves: "Those scales, so numerous and so rapid, whose rolling, like that of the thunder, made the listeners tremble with terror, who else but Liszt, in order to increase their sonority, would have dared play them in octaves?"

Liszt performed his "Erlkönig" 65 times during his tours of Germany between 1840 and 1845, more than any of his operatic paraphrases. Ludwig Rellstab, who reviewed one such concert, wrote in 1841 in the Vossische Zeitung: "To a quite different sphere, increasing the sensual excitement still further, belonged his playing of Schubert’s Erlkönig, a work widely known and heard, and yet now heard for the first time, truly electrifying the audience, which caused it to be encored more by their ever-renewed applause than by express demand."

Commenting on Liszt's arrangements of Schubert's Lieder, Robert Schumann wrote: "[they] have found a great deal of interest among the public. Performed by Liszt, they are said to be of great effect, and those who are not masters of the piano will try to play them to no avail. They are perhaps the most difficult works that exist for piano, and a witty person said, 'if one arranges a simplified version of them, and would be so curious to see how it would turn out, would it be the original version by Schubert?' Sometimes not: Liszt has made changes and additions; the way he has done it testifies to the powerful nature of his play, his conception; others may think differently. It boils down to the old question whether the performing artist may place himself above the creative artist, whether he may reshape the latter's works at will for himself. The answer is easy: we laugh at a fool if he does it badly, we allow a witty one if he does not downright destroy the meaning of the original. In the school of piano playing, this kind of arrangement marks a special chapter."

For solo violin (Ernst) 

Heinrich Wilhelm Ernst composed his Grand Caprice for solo violin on "Erlkönig", Op. 26, in 1854, in what represents the "pinnacle of violin technique". The work is characterized by its highly polyphonic nature, the solo violin having to perform the narrator, the Erlkönig, the father, and the child (4 independent voices) in their different vocal colourations, but also the complete piano accompaniment at the same time. This is accomplished through the use of double, triple and quadruple stops, artificial harmonics and left-hand pizzicato.

For voice and orchestra

Berlioz 
In 1846, during a visit to Prague, Berlioz witnessed a new musical rendition of Goethe's "Erlkönig" by Czech composer Václav Tomášek. As recalled by Berlioz in his memoirs, the two composers were soon drawn into an argument comparing Tomášek's composition to Schubert's: "Someone (for there are people who find fault with everything) drew a comparison between the accompaniment of this piece and that of Schubert's ballad, in which the furious gallop of the horse is reproduced, and declared that M. Tomášek had mimicked the placid gait of a priest's nag. An intelligent critic, however, more capable than his neighbours of judging of the philosophy of art, annihilated this irony, and replied with great good sense: 'It is just because Schubert made that unlucky horse gallop so wildly that it has foundered, and is now forced to go at a foot pace.'"

When Gustave-Hippolyte Roger asked him to orchestrate Schubert's work for a performance in Baden-Baden in 1860, Berlioz was too willing, as he felt that Schubert's piano accompaniment was essentially orchestral in nature. The arrangement was premiered at Baden-Baden on 27 August 1860, and was published in Paris the same year. Berlioz's biographer Jacques Barzun wrote of the arrangement: "From the finely wrought and polished score no one could suspect anything of the anxiety, illness, or conflicts in his heart and soul. It is delicate, poignant, full of insight into Schubert's masterpiece – a compendium of art concealing itself."

Berlioz's arrangement is scored for two flutes, oboe, English horn, two clarinets, two bassoons, three horns, two trumpets, timpani, strings, and solo voice.

Liszt 
During his later Weimar years, with many of his major works having been published, Liszt turned his attention to orchestral transcriptions. On Johann von Herbeck's request, who was the conductor of the Vienna Philharmonic, Liszt produced transcriptions of Schubert's marches. With his orchestration of the Reitermarsch (S. 363/3) have been a success, he decided to orchestrate six Lieder: "Die junge Nonne", "Gretchen am Spinnrade", "Lied der Mignon", "Erlkönig", "Der Doppelgänger", and "Abschied". Of these, which were completed in 1860, only the first four would be published in 1863 as Four Songs by Franz Schubert (S. 375). Ben Arnold notes the irony that Berlioz's arrangement, his only transcription of a Schubert song, was written in the same year.

Liszt's arrangement is scored for two flutes, two oboes, two clarinets, two bassoons, two horns, two trumpets, timpani, harp, strings, and solo voice.

Reger 
Reger was influential in the development of the orchestral Lied. He wrote: "To my ear, it is often a real insult to have to listen to a singer, following an orchestral piece in a gigantic hall, performing lieder to the spindly accompaniment of a piano in the huge space. But it goes without saying that one must make a very careful choice of the songs to be orchestrated."

After he was appointed music director of the Meiningen Court Orchestra in December 1911, Reger seems to have used the orchestra to experiment in orchestration. Between 1913 and 1914, he completed 45 orchestral arrangements of songs written by himself and others. He wrote to his publisher: "The instrumentation will ensure that the singer is never 'muffled'. I have so often noticed that the performance of songs in symphonic concerts has suffered greatly due to the fact that the gentlemen conducting were not really the best accompanists. This grievance will be remedied by the instrumentation; and dragging an extra grand piano on to the stage will not even be necessary... After having rehearsed daily for two whole winters, as it were, with the Meiningen Court Orchestra, and having performed many songs (solo songs!) with the orchestra, I know precisely how to orchestrate such matters."

Reger's arrangement of "Erlkönig" was completed in 1914, together with "Gretchen am Spinnrade", "Gruppe aus dem Tartarus", "Prometheus", and "Gesänge des Harfners". In the work, the restless piano accompaniment is performed by the strings, with the flute supporting the seductive sound of the Erlkönig.

Reger's arrangement is scored for flute, oboe, two clarinets, bassoon, two horns, timpani, strings, and solo voice.

References

Sources

Further reading

External links 

 
 Arrangement for solo piano (Liszt): 
 Arrangement for solo violin (Ernst): 
  by David Bennett Thomas

Lieder composed by Franz Schubert
1815 songs
Compositions in G minor
Musical settings of poems by Johann Wolfgang von Goethe
Songs about death
Songs about children